Islam Hassan also known as Eslam Issa or Eslam Eissa (born 2 July 1988) is an Egyptian handball player for Al Ahly and the Egyptian national team. He has also played for clubs in Tunisia and Qatar.

Honours

National team
African Championship:  Winner: 2016 Egypt;  Runners-up:2018 Gabon
Mediterranean Games:  Gold Medalist: Handball at the 2013 Mediterranean Games

Club

Al Ahly

Egyptian Handball League:  Winner: 2011–12, 2012–13, 2013–14, 2016–17, 2017-18 . 
Egypt Handball Cup:  Winner: (2) : 2008-09, 2013–14
African Super Cup:  Winner: (1) 2017 Aghadir
African Champions League:  Winner:(2) 2012 Tangier, Ouagadougou 2016
African Cup Winners' Cup:  Winner: (3) 2013 Hamammat , 2017 Aghadir , 2018 Cairo
Arab Championship of Champions:  Winner :(1) 2010 Cairo
Arab Handball Championship of Winners' Cup:  Winner :(1) 2011 Makkah

Club African

Tunisian Handball League:  Winner: 2014-15 . 
Tunisian Handball League:  Winner: 2014-15
African Super Cup:  Winner: (1) 2015 Gabon
African Champions League:  Winner:(1) 2014 Tunis, Ouagadougou 2016

References

1988 births
Living people
Egyptian male handball players
Place of birth missing (living people)
Handball players at the 2016 Summer Olympics
Olympic handball players of Egypt
African Games gold medalists for Egypt
African Games medalists in handball
Mediterranean Games gold medalists for Egypt
Mediterranean Games medalists in handball
Competitors at the 2011 All-Africa Games
Competitors at the 2013 Mediterranean Games
21st-century Egyptian people